

Films

References

Films
2007
2007-related lists